Widder or Widders may refer to:

People
David Widder
Dean Widders
Edith Widder
Felix Widder (disambiguation), several people
Frederick Widder
Nathan Widder

Other uses
 German auxiliary cruiser Widder
 Widder (icebreaker), an icebreaker operated by the Wasser- und Schifffahrtsamt